The 1898–99 season was the 11th season of The Football League. Two teams were able to win the First Division title going into the final day of the season: Aston Villa and Liverpool; second-placed Liverpool travelled to Villa Park for the final match, needing a win to overtake Villa and win the title, but Villa won 5–0 to win their fourth First Division title.

Defending champions Sheffield United had the first poor title defence in English top flight history, finishing 16th out of 18, barely avoiding the two relegation places.

Final league tables

The tables below are reproduced here in the exact form that they can be found at The Rec.Sport.Soccer Statistics Foundation website and in Rothmans Book of Football League Records 1888–89 to 1978–79, with home and away statistics separated.

Beginning with the season 1894–95, clubs finishing level on points were separated according to goal average (goals scored divided by goals conceded), or more properly put, goal ratio. In case one or more teams had the same goal difference, this system favoured those teams who had scored fewer goals. The goal average system was eventually scrapped beginning with the 1976–77 season.

During the first five seasons of the league, that is until the season, 1893–94, re-election process concerned the clubs which finished in the bottom four of the league. From the 1894–95 season and until the 1920–21 season the re-election process was required of the clubs which finished in the bottom three of the league.

First Division

Results

Maps

Second Division

Results

Maps

See also
1898–99 in English football
1898 in association football
1899 in association football

References
Ian Laschke: Rothmans Book of Football League Records 1888–89 to 1978–79. Macdonald and Jane's, London & Sydney, 1980.

1898-99
1